Bepo or BEPO may refer to:

 BÉPO, a keyboard layout optimized for the French language
 Bereitschaftspolizei or "BEPO", anti-riot units of the German Federal Police and Landespolizei
 British Experimental Pile 0 or "BEPO", an early British nuclear reactor built by the Atomic Energy Research Establishment
 Bepo, a fictional polar bear who is a member and navigator of the Heart Pirates under Trafalgar Law in the Japanese shōnen manga series One Piece

See also
 Beppo (disambiguation)